Sebastián Andrés Contreras Jofré (born 1 January 1988) is a Chilean footballer who last played for Segunda División Profesional de Chile side Deportes Concepción.

References
 Profile at BDFA 
 

1988 births
Living people
People from El Loa Province
Chilean footballers
Cobreloa footballers
Rangers de Talca footballers
Ñublense footballers
Deportes Concepción (Chile) footballers
Chilean Primera División players
Primera B de Chile players
Segunda División Profesional de Chile players
People from Antofagasta Region
Association football goalkeepers